The Buses of Somerset is the trading name used by bus operator First South West for services operated in Somerset from depots in the towns of Taunton and Bridgwater since 2014. The services were formerly managed as part of First Somerset & Avon.

History
Southern National was formed in 1983 as the Somerset and Dorset operations of Western National (then part of the National Bus Company). It was privatised in 1988, acquired by FirstGroup in 1999 and rebranded as First Southern National. In 2003 the Somerset operations of First Southern National were merged into First Somerset & Avon. In 2014 the services were relaunched as 'The Buses of Somerset'.

Livery
The new brand identity and livery is the first major departure from the FirstGroup corporate identity and livery which was previously applied almost universally across the group's bus operations. The business instead now uses a two tone green and cream livery with bespoke branding, website and social media profiles. Buses allocated to Taunton town services were branded 'The Buses of Taunton' but using the same livery as other buses in the fleet.

The livery was revised from 2020 with different shade of green and changed logos. Taunton town services now have a different arrangement of the two green colours and are branded 'Taunton's town buses'. Certain routes have specially branded buses including Taunton Park and Ride (orange and purple), Quantock Line (route 28; brown and cream), Burnham-on-Sea to Taunton (route 21; blue) and Exmoor Coaster (blue).

Depots
The Buses of Somerset initially operated from two depots in Taunton and Bridgwater along with an outstation in Minehead. Yeovil was added in 2016, having previously been part of First Hampshire & Dorset.

See also
First South West
First West of England
Taunton bus station

References

External links

Buses of Somerset website

FirstGroup bus operators in England
Bus operators in Somerset
2014 establishments in England
Companies based in Taunton